Trioceros goetzei, the Ilolo chameleon or Goetze's whistling chameleon, is a species of chameleon found in Tanzania and Malawi.

References

Trioceros
Reptiles described in 1899
Taxa named by Gustav Tornier
Reptiles of Tanzania
Reptiles of Malawi